Evan Alexander Newton (born April 1, 1988) is an American professional soccer player who plays as a goalkeeper.

Career

College and amateur
Newton played college soccer at Old Dominion University. He started all 17 games his freshman year and finished with a. 97 GAA, 52 saves, and 10 shutouts. In his sophomore year in 2007, he started every single game again and finished 2nd in CAA with a .67 GAA. In 2008, he was a preseason All-CAA selection, but due to an injury, he redshirted his junior year. In 2009, he led CAA with 9 shutouts and was fourth in save percentage. In his senior year, he set school records at Old Dominion in saves and shutouts with 254 saves and 36 shutouts.

During his college years, Newton also played for the Bradenton Academics and the Hampton Roads Piranhas in the USL Premier Development League.

Professional

On January 18, 2011, Newton was selected in the first round (7th overall) of the 2011 MLS Supplemental Draft by the Houston Dynamo. He was signed to a contract a month later.

On May 5, Newton was loaned to FC Tampa Bay of the North American Soccer League, following a season-ending knee injury suffered by Tampa's first-choice goalkeeper Daryl Sattler. Newton returned to Houston at the end of the 2011 NASL season.

Newton was waived by Houston on November 23, 2011.

Newton signed with San Jose Earthquakes on March 9, 2012. On July 28 of that year he played 45 minutes in a friendly against Swansea City.

On April 9, 2014 Newton signed with USL Pro club Arizona United.

On March 4, 2015 Newton signed with Oklahoma City Energy FC.

After spending two seasons with Sacramento Republic FC, Newton signed with FC Cincinnati on January 5, 2018.

Newton joined USL side Indy Eleven on January 8, 2019. Shortly after signing a new contract with Indy Eleven, Newton moved on a short-term loan to MLS side New York City FC ahead of their CONCACAF Champions League fixtures.

On January 29, 2021, Newton transferred to the Vancouver Whitecaps FC. On January 25, 2022, Newton was loaned to USL Championship side El Paso Locomotive FC for the 2022 season. He played 34 matches and kept 8 clean sheets.

References

External links
  
 
 Old Dominion bio

1988 births
Living people
American soccer players
Association football goalkeepers
FC Cincinnati (2016–18) players
El Paso Locomotive FC players
Houston Dynamo FC draft picks
Houston Dynamo FC players
IMG Academy Bradenton players
Indy Eleven players
New York City FC players
North American Soccer League players
OKC Energy FC players
Old Dominion Monarchs men's soccer players
Phoenix Rising FC players
Sacramento Republic FC players
San Jose Earthquakes players
Soccer players from Virginia Beach
Soccer players from Richmond, Virginia
Sportspeople from Virginia Beach, Virginia
Tampa Bay Rowdies players
USL Championship players
United States men's youth international soccer players
USL League Two players
Vancouver Whitecaps FC players
Virginia Beach Piranhas players